The Lille Métropole Museum of Modern, Contemporary and Outsider Art (LaM), formerly known as Villeneuve d'Ascq Museum of Modern Art, is an art museum in Villeneuve d'Ascq, France.

With more than 4,500 artworks on a  exhibition area, the LaM is the only museum in Europe to present simultaneously the main components of the 20th and 21st centuries art : modern art, contemporary art and outsider art. LaM's holdings include some masterpieces of Pablo Picasso, Amedeo Modigliani, Joan Miró, Georges Braque, Fernand Léger, Alexander Calder and the biggest outsider art collection in France. LaM possesses also a library and a rich park of sculptures.

The museum's collection offers an overview in modern and contemporary art, including drawings, painting, sculpture, photography, prints, illustrated books and artist's books, and electronic media.

History 
The Villeneuve d'Ascq Museum of Modern Art is opened in 1983 to house the collection of modern art donated by Geneviève and Jean Masurel to Lille conurbation. In 1999, the collections were enriched with a collection of outsider art, thanks to the donation made by the association L'Aracine. In 2002, Manuelle Gautrand was the winner of a competition for the restructuring and extension of the museum. The museum was closed in January, 2006 for restructuring. On September 25, 2010, the museum re-opened under a new name, Lille Métropole Museum of Modern, Contemporary and Outsider Art (LaM).

Architecture 
The museum was built by Roland Simounet in 1983 in a green setting. The building is registered in French Inventaire supplémentaire des Monuments historiques in 2000.

Manuelle Gautrand designed an extension, covering 2700 m², of which the construction ended in 2010.

Artworks

In the park

In the museum: Modern Art

In the museum: Contemporary art

In the museum: Outsider art

Library 
The LaM possesses a library-research center with nearly 40,000 books.

Temporary exhibitions 
 2010/09/25 - 2011/01/30 : The world as poem. Outsider and Contemporary art exhibition, which highlights artists, writers and film-makers can dwell poetically in the world, in the words of Friedrich Hölderlin.

References

External links

 Official website
 Lille Museum of Modern, Contemporary and Outsider Art on Architecture News Plus

Buildings and structures in Villeneuve-d'Ascq
Contemporary art galleries in France
Outsider art
Art museums and galleries in France
Museums in Nord (French department)
Art museums established in 1983
1983 establishments in France
Modern art museums in France